Nortorf is a town in the district of Rendsburg-Eckernförde, in Schleswig-Holstein, Germany. It is approximately 13 km northwest of Neumünster, and 25 km southwest of Kiel.

Geography
The location of Nortorf is south of the municipality of Ellerdorf, but north of Gnutz, and east of Bargstedt.

History 
Nortorf acquired the status of a city on July 17, 1909. Previously, in summer 1899, the first town hall had been opened in Nortorf.

As a consequence of World War II, Nortorf experienced a significant influx of refugees, displaced persons and evacuees, raising its population from 3359 (May 1939) to 6047 (October 1946).

Personalities
 Martin Ehlers (1732–1800), educational reformer and philosopher
 Carl Christian Seydewitz (1777–1857), portrait painter
 Harboe Kardel (1893–1982), Nazi journalist
 Hans Sommer (SS officer) (1914–?), SS officer and spy Organization Gehlen
 Kurt Hamer (1926–1991), Social Democratic politician
 Oliver Stern (born 1953), country singer and songwriter, lyricist, music producer and book author
 Sabine Kaack (born 1959), actress
 Johanna Dorothea Albers, born Rathjen (1850–1939), mother of the playwright Hans Albers

Connected to Nortorf 
 Joshua Bluhm (born 1994) German bobsledder and lives in Nortorf 
 Peter Voß (1891–1979) German actor

References

External links

 
Towns in Schleswig-Holstein
Rendsburg-Eckernförde